Kurima is a district and a valley located in the highlands of Western New Guinea, in Highland Papua, Indonesia.

Geography 
The boundaries of the Kurima District are as follows:

References 

Populated places in Highland Papua

Landforms of Western New Guinea
Valleys of Indonesia
Landforms of Highland Papua